DFOA may refer to:

 Dano Airport, Burkina Faso
 Deferoxamine, a medicine